SMS G12 was a V1-class large torpedo boat of the Imperial German Navy. She was built by the Germaniawerft shipyard at Kiel between 1911 and 1912.

G12 served during the First World War. She was sunk following a collision on 8 September 1915.

Design and construction
In the first decade of the 20th century, the Imperial German Navy had generally ordered twelve large torpedo boats (Große Torpedoboote) as part of each year's construction programme, with a gradual evolution of design in each year's orders, with speed, range and seaworthiness improving year-on-year. These changes resulted in the ships becoming larger, and concerns grew that the torpedo boats were becoming too big to manoeuvre in and out of the battle fleet. For the 1911 fiscal year's orders, it was decided to revert to a smaller design, with the numbering system for torpedo boats restarting as a consequence. As was normal practice, that year's order was split between two shipyards, with six (V1–V6) to be built by AG Vulcan and six (G7–G12) by Germaniawerft, with detailed design differing between the two shipyards.

Displacement was  design and  full load.

The ship was armed with two 8.8 cm SK L/30 naval guns, (replaced by 8.8 cm SK L/45 naval guns in 1916), one on the forecastle and one aft. Four single 50 cm (19.7 in) torpedo tubes were fitted, with two on the ship's beam in the gap between the forecastle and the ship's bridge which were capable of firing straight ahead, and two on the ship's centreline aft of the funnels. 18 mines could be carried. The ship had a crew of 74 officers and men.

G12 was laid down at Germaniawerft's Kiel shipyard as yard number 175, was launched on 15 July 1912 and completed on 17 October 1912.

Service
G12 joined the 5th Torpedo boat flotilla, becoming leader of the flotilla.

First World War
G12 remained the leader of the 5th Torpedo boat flotilla of the German High Seas Fleet on the outbreak of war. On 28 August 1914, the British Harwich Force, supported by light cruisers and battlecruisers of the Grand Fleet, carried out a raid towards Heligoland with the intention of destroying patrolling German torpedo boats. The 5th Torpedo-boat flotilla, together with four German light cruisers, waited near Heligoland in support. The 5th Torpedo-boat Flotilla, including G12, were sent out from Heligoland to investigate sightings of British submarines, and ran into several British destroyers. The Flotilla then turned away to try and escape the trap, but the torpedo boat , which along with  could not make full speed and lagged behind the rest of the flotilla, was hit by British shells before the arrival of the German cruiser  allowed the 5th Flotilla to escape. The torpedo boat  of the outer screen did not manage to evade the British force and was sunk. G12 was undamaged.

On 23 January 1915, a German force of Battlecruisers and light cruisers, escorted by torpedo boats, and commanded by Admiral Franz von Hipper, made a sortie to attack British fishing boats on the Dogger Bank. G21 led the 5th Tprpedo-boat flotilla as part of the escort for Hipper's force. British Naval Intelligence was warned of the raid by radio messages decoded by Room 40, and sent out the Battlecruiser Force from Rosyth, commanded by Admiral Beatty aboard  and the Harwich Force of light cruisers and destroyers, to intercept the German force. The British and German Forces met on the morning of 24 January in the Battle of Dogger Bank. On sighting the British, Hipper ordered his ships to head south-east to escape the British, who set off in pursuit. The armoured cruiser  was disabled by British shells and was sunk, but the rest of the German force escaped, with the German battlecruiser  and the British battlecruiser  badly damaged.

On 8 September 1915, the 5th and 9th Torpedo Boat Flotillas were on patrol north west of the Horns Reef when G12 suffered a steering failure and rammed V1. Two of V1s torpedoes exploded, wrecking V1s bow and sinking G12, killing 47 of G12s  crew and 35 of V1s. V1 was towed back to Wilhelmshaven.

Notes

References

Bibliography

 
 
 
 
 
 
 
 

Torpedo boats of the Imperial German Navy
World War I torpedo boats of Germany
Ships built in Kiel
1912 ships